Kang Hyun-muk (born 28 March 2001) is a South Korean professional footballer who plays as a midfielder for Gimcheon Sangmu.

Career statistics

References 

2001 births
Living people
South Korean footballers
Association football midfielders
K League 1 players
Suwon Samsung Bluewings players